Trent Bridge in a cricket ground in West Bridgford on the edge of Nottingham in England. The area was first used for cricket in the late 18th century and the first inter-county match was held on the ground in 1835 before the ground was formally established in the 1840s. It is the home ground of Nottinghamshire County Cricket Club and was used for association football by Notts County F.C. until 1910. 

International cricket was first played on the ground in 1899 when England played Australia in the ground's first Test match. The first One Day International (ODI) was played on the ground in 1974 and the first Twenty20 International (T20I) match on the ground was played in 2009 during the 2009 ICC World Twenty20 competition. A single Women's Test match was played in the ground in 1979. Three Women's ODIs and a single Women's T20I have been played on the ground. The most recent Women's international match played at Trent Bridge was a semi-final of the 2009 ICC Women's World Twenty20 competition.

In cricket, a five-wicket haul (also known as a "five-for" or "fifer") refers to a bowler taking five or more wickets in a single innings. This is regarded as a notable achievement. This article details the five-wicket hauls taken on the ground in official international Test and One Day International matches.

The first five-wicket haul in international cricket on the ground was taken during the ground's first Test match in 1899, Australian Ernie Jones taking five wickets for 88 runs (5/88) in a drawn match against England. The best innings figures in a Test match on the ground are Stuart Broad's 8/15 taken against Australia in 2015. The only Women's Test match on the ground saw Julia Greenwood take a five-wicket haul for England Women against West Indies in 1979. This is the only five-wicket haul taken in Women's international cricket on the ground. In One Day International cricket the first five-wicket hauls were taken by Kapil Dev and Ken MacLeay during a match between India and Australia during the 1983 Cricket World Cup. MacLeay's six wickets for 39 runs remained the best ODI bowling figures on the ground until Paul Collingwood took 6/31 against Bangladesh in 2005.

Key

Test match five-wicket hauls

A total of 90 five-wicket hauls have been taken in Test matches at Trent Bridge, including one in the only women's Test match held on the ground.

Men's matches

Women's matches

One Day International five-wicket hauls

Seven five-wicket hauls have been taken in ODIs on the ground.

Notes

References

External links
International five-wicket hauls at Trent Bridge, CricInfo

Trent Bridge